The 1991 Commonwealth Heads of Government Meeting was the 12th Meeting of the Heads of Government of the Commonwealth of Nations.  It was held in Harare, Zimbabwe, between 16 October 1991 and 21 October 1991, and was hosted by that country's President, Robert Mugabe.

The Harare Declaration was issued at the CHOGM setting out the Commonwealth's core principles and values and its membership criteria, reaffirming and expanding upon the Singapore Declaration which had been issued twenty years earlier.

1991
Diplomatic conferences in Zimbabwe
20th-century diplomatic conferences
1991 conferences
1991 in international relations
1991 in Zimbabwe
Zimbabwe and the Commonwealth of Nations
20th century in Harare
October 1991 events in Africa